Miomachairodus is an extinct genus of large saber-toothed cats of the subfamily Machairodontinae. It is known from Miocene-age fossils in China and Turkey and persisted until the Late Miocene (early Vallesian). Fossils of this machairodont have been found in the Vallesian-age Bahe Formation in Shaanxi, China, and Yeni Eskihisar in Anatolia. This Turkish site is of Miocene age and is well known for its pollen studies.

References

Cenozoic animals of Asia
Machairodontinae
Miocene felids
Pliocene carnivorans
Prehistoric carnivoran genera
Fossil taxa described in 1976